The Dent site is a Clovis culture (about 11,000 years before present) site located in Weld County, Colorado, near Milliken, Colorado.  It provided evidence that humans and mammoths co-existed in the Americas.

The site is located on an alluvial fan alongside the South Platte River.

Discovery
Following a period of heavy rainfall and flooding in August 27th 1908, George Mcjunkin, a black cowboy, discovered large animal bones that were exposed near a ranch located in Folsom New Mexico. Because of Mcjunkin's major contribution to American history he received his spot in the Hall of Great Westerners, managed by The National Cowboy and Western Heritage Museum  Shortly after Mcjunkin's death in 1922 and well after his discovery in 1908, his reports of the large bison bones were taken seriously. Carl Schwacheim, Harold Cook, and JD Figgins of the Colorado Museum of Natural History came to follow up on George Mcjunkin reports and began excavations on the ranch.

The Dent site, in Weld County, Colorado, was a fossil mammoth excavation for most of 1932. The first Dent Clovis point was found November 5, 1932 and the in situ point was found July 7, 1933.

Findings

Clovis culture

The Clovis culture (about 13,300 - 12,900 calendar years before present) used projectile points in hunting.  Previous to the use of projectile points, indigenous people used a tool-kit like that used in Asia, which included large axe cutting tools, scrapers, blades and flake tools.  The Clovis point was the first use of large, symmetrical and fluted projectile points.

Mammoth bones

Mammoth bones and what were later called Clovis points were found at the Dent site in 1932.  The site was notable for both the presence of the projectile points larger than the known Folsom points and one of the first direct pieces of evidence that man and mammoth co-existed in the Americas. The mammoth killed were not part of a family group, as originally hypothesized, and were not related to other mammoth killed at Clovis sites, such as Blackwater, New Mexico and Miami, Texas.

Excavations

See also 
 Game drive system
 Manis Mastodon site – dated to around 14,000 years old

Notes

References

Further reading
 Brunswig, Robert H; Pitblado, Bonnie L. (editors). (2007). Frontiers in Colorado Paleoindian Archaeology, From the Dent Site to the Rocky Mountains. University of Colorado Press. .
 Haynes, Gary. (1993). Mammoths, mastodonts, and elephants: biology, behavior, and the fossil record. Cambridge University Press. .

Archaeology of the United States
Archaeological sites in Colorado
Paleo-Indian archaeological sites in Colorado
Clovis culture